Florence D. Buhr (née Wederquist; April 7, 1933 – May 12, 2018) was an American politician in the state of Iowa. Buhr was born in Mills County, Iowa. She attended University of Northern Iowa and is a former teacher. A Democrat, she served in the Iowa House of Representatives from 1983 to 1995 (85th district) Iowa Senate from 1995 to 2003 (43rd district 1991 to 1993 and 35th district from 1993 to 1995).

She died on May 12, 2018, in Johnston, Iowa at age 85.

References

1933 births
2018 deaths
People from Mills County, Iowa
University of Northern Iowa alumni
Educators from Iowa
American women educators
Women state legislators in Iowa
Democratic Party members of the Iowa House of Representatives
Democratic Party Iowa state senators
21st-century American women